Hede von Trapp (18 November 1877 – 29 December 1947) was an Austrian poet, painter and graphic designer of the Art Nouveau movement.

Biography
von Trapp was born in Pula, Austria-Hungary, on 18 November 1877. She was the daughter of the August von Trapp, who only a year earlier (1876) had been raised to Austrian knighthood. Her younger brother was the U-boat commander Georg Ritter von Trapp (1880–1947), father of the Trapp singing family portrayed in The Sound of Music. Hede Trapp worked as a writer and poet. She studied in the master class of the Berlin painter Erich Ludwig Stahl. From 1909, she started to illustrate her own books. In July 1911, she had an exhibition with 70 pen drawings and etchings in the Miethke Gallery in Vienna. In 1914, she participated from 1 February to 31 March at the International Exhibition in the Kunsthalle Bremen. She lived and worked in Korneuburg, where the Hede-von-Trapp-Straße is named after her.

von Trapp died on 29 December 1947 in Korneuburg, Austria.

References

External links
The International Studio, Volume 49, page 240-241
Items by Hede von Trapp on Europeana Collections

1877 births
1947 deaths
20th-century Austrian painters
20th-century Austrian artists
20th-century Austrian women artists
Hede
Austrian graphic designers
Austrian Roman Catholics
Austrian nobility

Art Nouveau painters
Art Nouveau designers
People from Korneuburg District
People from Pula
Women graphic designers
Austro-Hungarian artists